The Art of War is a highly influential ancient Chinese military treatise attributed to Sun Tzu.

The Art of War may also refer to:

General topics
Warfare, the art of war
Military art, war art; art with a military subject matter, regardless of its style or medium
military treatise, a treatise on the art of war
martial arts, combat arts, fighting arts, war arts

Literature
The Art of War: Five Years in Formula One
The Art of War (comics), a 2012 graphic novel by Kelly Roman and Michael DeWeese
The Art of War, a 2016 novel by Stephen Coonts

Military treatises
Sun Bin's Art of War, a Chinese text by an alleged descendant of Sun Tzu
The Art of War (Machiavelli book), a 1521 book by Niccolò Machiavelli
The Methods of the Sima or The Art of War, a military treatise by Sima Rangju
The Art of War, a 19th-century treatise by Baron Antoine-Henri Jomini
The Art of War, a compilation of 20th-century writings on warfare by Mao Zedong

Music
The Art of War (Bone Thugs-n-Harmony album) (1997)
The Art of War (Sabaton album)
The Art of War (EP), an EP by Vader
The Art of War, an album by Anarchy Club
"The Art of War", a song from the score of the film Battleship
"Art of War", a 2013 song by We the Kings

Other uses
The Arts of War, two statues in Washington, D.C.
The Art of War (film), a 2000 action film starring Wesley Snipes
Art of War Fighting Championship, a mixed martial arts organization based in Beijing, China
Cossacks: Art of War, a 2001 real-time strategy computer game
The Art of War, a 2008 board game set in the fictional universe the Legend of the Five Rings
"The Art of War", an episode of Exosquad

See also

The Ancient Art of War, a 1984–1993 series of computer games by Evryware released
The Operational Art of War, a series of computer wargames
The War of Art (disambiguation)
 
 
 
 War (disambiguation)
 Art (disambiguation)